The Me and You Show is an American sketch comedy series, which premiered on Snapchat on October 1, 2021. It is Snapchat's first effort exploring augmented reality programming.

The Me and You Show was renewed for a second season, which premiered on November 25, 2022. The first season was streamed by over 50 million viewers.

Episodes

Season 1 (2021)

Season 2 (2022–23)

References

External links
 
 

Snap Inc.
2021 American television series debuts
2020s American sketch comedy television series